The Thailand national under-23 football team, also known as the Thailand Olympic football team, is the national team for the under-23 and 22 level, representing Thailand in international football competitions in the Olympic Games, Asian Games and Southeast Asian Games, as well as any other under-23 international football tournaments including the AFC U-23 Championship. It is controlled by the Football Association of Thailand.

The team has won the Southeast Asian Games gold medal for a record 7 times, making it the most successful among ASEAN football teams. Despite its major domination in Southeast Asia, the team never won any gold medal in Asian level.

History

2013–present

2014 Asian Games
The 2014 Asian Games was held in Incheon, South Korea. The Thailand U23 Team under coach Kiatisuk Senamuang built a young-blood team that would later become the main Thailand senior team with players such as Chanathip Songkrasin, Sarach Yooyen, Kawin Thamsatchanan, Charyl Chappuis, etc. In this competition the team made top performance by finishing in fourth place, the highest in the Asian Games after 1998.

2016 AFC U-23 Championship
The 2016 AFC U-23 Championship final tournament was held in Qatar from 12–30 January 2016. Thailand qualified for the tournament by runner-up in the qualification stage in homeland in March 2015. The Young Elephants recorded comprehensive victories; 2–1 against Cambodia; 5–1 against Philippines and 0–0 against North Korea.

The 2016 AFC U-23 Championship doubled as the qualifying tournament for the 2016 Summer Olympics Football tournament in Rio de Janeiro. Thailand were eliminated from the championship in the group stage. A 1–1 draw to Saudi Arabia followed by a 0–4 loss to Japan meant that Thailand needed to defeat North Korea in the final group match. A nil-all draw resulted in the elimination for Thailand from the tournament and hence failure to qualify for the Olympics. Although eliminated, Thailand earned praise and reputation for its strong performance in the tournament.

2018 AFC U-23 Championship
In the 2018 AFC U-23 Championship, Thailand only finished second in their qualification, but with the team being undefeated, Thailand beat Malaysia 3–0 and was held draws by Mongolia and Indonesia, Thailand became the best runners-up to qualify. The Young Elephants prepared by hosting the friendly 2017 M-150 Cup, where they finished fourth but managed to beat Japan 2–1. This enthusiastic performance of Thailand put up great hope for the team, having earlier conquered the 2017 SEA Games.

However, having entered the tournament, it would become Thailand's complete nightmare. They opened their game with a 0–1 loss to North Korea before got slapped with the same result to Japan, eventually eliminated the Young Elephants from the competition. The Thais bid goodbye from the competition in a humiliating fashion, with a devastating 1–5 loss to Palestine. To add the dismay, their defeated rivals Malaysia and Vietnam both moved on to progress from the group stage, with the latter managed to reach the final and ended in second place.

2020 AFC U-23 Championship
Thailand was awarded as host of the 2020 AFC U-23 Championship, therefore they were automatically qualified. Thailand still participated in the qualification as an opportunity to train and improve the team. Thailand, once again, finished second, after beating Indonesia and Brunei, but lost to Vietnam. Before the tournament, Thailand was eliminated at the 2019 Southeast Asian Games after the group stage.

In the group stage, Thailand would face Iraq, Australia and maiden debutant Bahrain, and was tipped favorably to progress, mainly due to Australia's underperformance in the tournament and inexperienced Bahrain. Thailand prepared by playing against Saudi Arabia in the friendly encounter, but lost 0–1. In their first match against inexperienced Bahrain, the Thais proved to be too dominant for the visitor, as the Thais demolished Bahrain 5–0. This win allowed more Thai supporters coming to cheer for the Thai side in their second encounter against underperformed Australia, instead, Thailand suffered a heartbreaking 1–2 loss to Australia despite having taken the lead and putting Thailand's quest to the final stage in their final game against Iraq. In final matches in group state Thailand draw Iraq 1–1 earn a spot in the quarterfinals of the tournament for the first time in AFC U-23 Championship as the second-placed team in the group behind Australia. In quarterfinals Thailand have to face with the winner of Group B, Saudi Arabia and lost with penalty 1-0 end the way to 2020 Olympic Games in Tokyo.

2022 AFC U-23 Asian Cup
The 2022 AFC U-23 Asian Cup final tournament was held in Uzbekistan from 1–19 June 2022. Thailand qualified for the tournament by runner-up in the qualification stage in Mongolia in October 2021, which drew; 1-1 against Mongolia; 3-0 against Laos and 0–0 against Malaysia.

In the group stage, Thailand(pot2) was drawn into group C with South Korea(pot1), Vietnam(pot3), and Malaysia(pot4). All match will be played at Tashkent

Results and fixtures

2023

Coaching staff

Current coaching staff

Manager history

Players

Current squad
The following 23 players were called up for 2023 Doha Cup U-23.

Recent call-ups
The following players have been called up within the last 12 months.

Notes:
INJ Withdrew from squad due to injury
PRE Preliminary squad
SUS Suspended
WD Player withdrew from the squad for non-injury related reasons

Previous squads

AFC U-23 Asian Cup
2016 AFC U-23 Championship squad
2018 AFC U-23 Championship squad
2020 AFC U-23 Championship squad
2022 AFC U-23 Asian Cup squad

Asian Games
2002 Asian Games squad
2006 Asian Games squad
2010 Asian Games squad
2014 Asian Games squad
2018 Asian Games squad

SEA Games
2005 Southeast Asian Games squad
2007 Southeast Asian Games squad
2009 Southeast Asian Games squad
2011 Southeast Asian Games squad
2013 Southeast Asian Games squad
2015 Southeast Asian Games squad
2017 Southeast Asian Games squad
2019 Southeast Asian Games squad
2021 Southeast Asian Games squad

Competitive record

Olympic Games

Note
*:Denotes draws including knockout matches decided on penalty kicks.

AFC U-23 Asian Cup

Note
1: The under-22 team played at the 2013 edition.
*: Denotes draws including knockout matches decided on penalty kicks. ''

Asian Games

Note
1: The senior national team played at the 1951 to 1998 editions.
*: Denotes draws including knockout matches decided on penalty kicks.

Southeast Asian Games

Note
1: The senior national team played at the 1959 to 1999 editions.
2: The under-22 national team
*: Denotes draws including knockout matches decided on penalty kicks.

AFF U-23 Championship

Note
*: Denotes draws including knockout matches decided on penalty kicks.
*: The under-22 national team played at the 2019 edition onwards.

Summer Universiade

Note
*: Denotes draws including knockout matches decided on penalty kicks.

Head-to-head record
An all-time record table of Thailand national under-23 football team in major competitions only including; Summer Olympics, AFC U-23 Championship, M-150 Cup, Asian Games and Southeast Asian Games.

Honours
This is a list of honours for the Thailand national under-23 football team.

International titles
Summer Universiade
Bronze medal (1): 2007
Asian Games
Fourth place (2): 2002, 2014

Regional titles
Southeast Asian Games
Gold medal (7): 2001, 2003, 2005, 2007, 2013, 2015, 2017
Silver medal (1): 2021
AFF U-23 Youth Championship
Winners (1): 2005
Runner-up (2): 2019, 2022

Minor titles
Dubai Cup
Winners (1): 2017
BIDC Cup (Cambodia)
Winners (1): 2013

See also
Thailand national football team
Thailand national under-21 football team
Thailand national under-20 football team
Thailand national under-17 football team
Football in Thailand

References

External links
Football Association of Thailand 

Asian national under-23 association football teams
U23